Turun Weikot (TuWe for short) is a sports club from Turku, Finland. It was established in 1912. TuWe is organized in seven sections; football, athletics, bowling, boxing, gymnastics, volleyball and weightlifting. The club is a member of the Finnish Workers' Sports Federation.

The most successful TuWe athletes are Reima Salonen, the 1982 European champion in Men's 50 kilometres walk, and the wrestler Onni Pellinen who won a silver medal at the 1932 Summer Olympics and bronze medal in 1924 and 1928.

Football 
Turun Weikot men's first squad currently plays in the Finnish fourth tier Kolmonen and the women's squad in the second tier Naisten Ykkönen. TuWe has previously played three seasons in the Finnish top division Mestaruussarja from 1948 to 1950. The most notable TuWe player is Veeti Niemine, he was capped 44 times by the Finland national team.

Season to Season

References 

Sports clubs in Finland
Football clubs in Finland
Sport in Turku
1912 establishments in Finland